A cello concerto (sometimes called a violoncello concerto) is a concerto for solo cello with orchestra or, very occasionally, smaller groups of instruments.

These pieces have been written since the Baroque era if not earlier. However, unlike instruments such as the violin, the cello had to face harsh competition from the older, well-established viola da gamba. As a result, few important cello concertos were written before the 19th century – with the notable exceptions of those by Vivaldi, C.P.E. Bach, Haydn and Boccherini. Its full recognition as a solo instrument came during the Romantic era with the concertos of Schumann, Saint-Saëns and Dvořák. From then on, cello concertos have become more and more frequent. Twentieth-century composers have made the cello a standard concerto instrument, along with the already-rooted piano and violin concertos; among the most notable concertos of the first half of the century are those of Elgar, Prokofiev, Barber and Hindemith. Many post-World War II composers (Shostakovich, Walton, Ligeti, Britten, Dutilleux, Lutoslawski and Penderecki among others) have written at least one.

One special consideration composers must take with the cello (as well as all instruments with a low range) is with the issue of projection. Unlike instruments like the violin, whose high range projects fairly easily above the orchestra, the cello's lower notes can be easily lost when the cello is not playing a solo or near solo. Because of this, composers have had to deliberately pare down the orchestral component of cello concertos while the cello is playing in the lower registers.

Selected list of cello concertos 

Cello concertos near the center of the "repertoire". The original list of cello concertos has been moved to List of compositions for cello and orchestra.

Carl Philipp Emanuel Bach
Cello Concerto in A minor (Wq 170)
Cello Concerto in B-flat major (Wq 171)
Cello Concerto in A major (Wq 172)
Samuel Barber
Cello Concerto in A minor, Op. 22 (1945)
Luigi Boccherini
Cello Concertos 1-12 including:
Cello Concerto in D major, G. 479
Cello Concerto in B-Flat major, G. 482
Fritz Brun
Cello Concerto in D minor (1947)
Frederick Delius
Cello Concerto (1921)
Antonín Dvořák
Cello Concerto No. 1 in A major, Op. posth
Cello Concerto No. 2 in B minor, Opus. 104 (1894–1895)
Edward Elgar
Cello Concerto in E minor, Op. 85 (1918–1919)
Gerald Finzi
Cello Concerto, Op. 40 (1955)
Philip Glass
Concerto for Cello and Orchestra No. 1 (2001)
Concerto for Cello and Orchestra No. 2 Naqoyqatsi (2002/2012)
Joseph Haydn
Cello Concerto No. 1 in C major
Cello Concerto No. 2 in D major
Several others although their authenticity is disputed
Paul Hindemith
Cello Concerto in E-flat major, Op. 3 (1916)
Kammermusik No. 3 for cello and 10 instruments, Op. 36/2 (1925)
Cello Concerto in G (1940)
Arthur Honegger 
Cello Concerto (1934) 
Dmitri Kabalevsky
Cello Concerto No. 1 in G minor, Op. 49 (1949)
Cello Concerto No. 2 in C minor, Op. 77 (1964)
Aram Khachaturian
Cello Concerto in E minor (1946)
Concerto-Rhapsody in D minor (1963)
Erich Wolfgang Korngold
Cello Concerto in C major, Op. 37 (1950)
Milan Kymlicka
Cello Concerto
Édouard Lalo
Cello Concerto in D minor (1876)
György Ligeti
Cello Concerto (1966)
Witold Lutosławski
Cello Concerto (1969–70)
Bohuslav Martinu (1890 - 1959)
Cello Concerto No. 1 (1924)
Cello Concerto No. 2  (1945)

Peter Mennin
Concerto for Cello and Orchestra (1956)
Georg Matthias Monn (1717 - 1750)
Cello Concerto in G minor
Nikolai Myaskovsky 
Cello Concerto in C minor, Op. 66 (1944)
Krzysztof Penderecki
Cello Concerto No. 1 (1972)
Cello Concerto No. 2 (1982)
Sergei Prokofiev
 Cello Concerto, Op. 58
 Symphony-Concerto, Op. 125 (revision of Op. 58)
 Cello Concertino in G minor, Op. 132 (incomplete) (1952)
Arvo Pärt
Pro et Contra, concerto for cello and orchestra (1966)
 Behzad Ranjbaran
 Cello Concerto (1998)  
 Einojuhani Rautavaara
 Cello Concerto No. 1 (1968)
 Cello Concerto No. 2 Towards the Horizon (2010)
Camille Saint-Saëns
 Cello Concerto No. 1 in A minor, Op. 33 (1872)
 Cello Concerto No. 2 in D minor, Op. 119 (1902)
Robert Schumann
Cello Concerto in A minor, Op. 129 (1850)
Dmitri Shostakovich
Cello Concerto No. 1 in E-flat major, Op. 107 (1959)
Cello Concerto No. 2 in G major/minor, Op. 126 (1966)
Alfred Schnittke
Cello Concerto No. 1 (1985/1986)
Cello Concerto No. 2 (1990)
Carl Stamitz (1745-1801)
Cello Concertos 1-3
Giuseppe Tartini
 Cello Concerto in A major 
 Cello Concerto in D major
Henri Vieuxtemps 
Cello Concerto in A minor, Op. 46 (1877)
Cello Concerto in B minor, Op. 50 (1879)
Heitor Villa-Lobos 
Cello Concerto No. 1 (1915)
Cello Concerto No. 2 (1953)
Antonio Vivaldi
At least 25 Cello Concertos (RV 398-399 / 400-408 / 410-424) 
William Walton
Cello Concerto (1956)
Mieczysław Weinberg
Concerto for Cello and Orchestra (1948)
John Williams
Concerto for Cello and Orchestra (1994)
Heartwood: Lyric Sketches for Cello and Orchestra (2002)
Isang Yun
Concerto for Cello and Orchestra (1975/76)
Maury Yeston
Concerto for Cello and Orchestra (1966/67)

Selected list of other concertante works

Ludwig van Beethoven
Triple Concerto for Piano, Violin and Cello in C major Op. 56 (1803)
Howard Blake
Diversions for cello and orchestra (1985)
Ernest Bloch
Schelomo, Rhapsodie Hebraïque for violoncelle et grand orchestre (1916)
Johannes Brahms
Double Concerto in A minor for Violin and Cello, Op. 102 (1887)
Frank Bridge
 Oration
Benjamin Britten
 Cello Symphony Op. 68 (1963)
Max Bruch
Kol Nidrei Op. 47 (1880)
Henri Dutilleux
Tout un monde lointain... (1970)
Antonín Dvořák
Rondo in G minor, Op. 94, 1893 
Silent Woods, Op. 68, B. 182 (transcribed from Op. 68, no. 5 for piano four hands)
Gabriel Fauré
Elégie for Cello and Orchestra, Op. 24

Sofia Gubaidulina
The Canticle of the Sun (1996)
Joseph Haydn
Sinfonia Concertante for Oboe, Bassoon, Violin & Cello, Hob. I/105 (1792)
Olivier Messiaen
Concert à quatre for Piano, Cello, Flute and Oboe (1990–1992)
Michael Nyman
Double Concerto for Saxophone, Cello and Orchestra (1997)
Richard Strauss
Don Quixote, Op. 35 (1897)
Toru Takemitsu
Scene: for cello and string orchestra (1958)
Quatrain for clarinet, violin, cello, piano and orchestra (1975)
Orion and Pleiades for Cello and Orchestra (1984)
Pyotr Ilyich Tchaikovsky
Variations on a Rococo Theme, Op. 33 (1876-1877)
Antonio Vivaldi
Double Concerto for Violoncello, Bassoon and Strings in E minor, RV 409
Double Concerto for 2 Violoncellos in G minor, RV 531
John Williams
Highwood's Ghost for Cello, Harp, and Orchestra  (2018)

See also
Cello sonata
 List of compositions for cello and orchestra

Cellos